Yakhouba Diawara (born August 29, 1982) is a French former professional basketball player. He played college basketball at Southern Idaho and Pepperdine.

Early career
Diawara started his career with French team JDA Dijon, and after his first season in the European League, Diawara decided to attend college in the United States. He first attended junior college at Southern Idaho, playing 63 games and averaging 12.1 points, 6.8 rebounds, 1.0 assists and 24.1 minutes while shooting 54.2 percent from the floor, 31.8 percent from three-point range and 58.6 percent from the free throw line. After two years, he transferred to Pepperdine where he averaged 15.5 points, 6.0 rebounds, 1.0 assists and 32.5 minutes while shooting 45.6 percent from the floor, 34.3 percent from three-point range and 65 percent from the free throw line earning First Team All-West Coast Conference honors as a junior.

Professional career
Diawara went undrafted after graduating from Pepperdine and signed with Dijon again. In February 2006, he moved to Italian team Climamio Bologna. He was signed by the Denver Nuggets on July 26, 2006. He signed with the Miami Heat on August 7, 2008.

On July 24, 2010, Diawara signed with Enel Brindisi in Italy. For the 2011–12 season, he signed a one-year deal with Pallacanestro Varese. On July 21, 2012, he signed with another Italian team, Umana Reyer Venezia. He left Venezia on July 16, 2013. In September 2013, he signed a one-year deal with BCM Gravelines, however, he parted ways with them on March 10, 2014. On August 21, 2014, he returned to Cimberio Varese for the 2014–15 season.

On September 28, 2015, Diawara signed with the Memphis Grizzlies, returning to the NBA for the first time since 2010. However, he was waived on October 24 after appearing in six preseason games. On November 2, he signed with Limoges for the rest of the 2015–16 season.

On January 16, 2017, Diawara signed with Italian club Juvecaserta Basket for the rest of the 2016–17 LBA season.

On December 17, 2017, Diawara signed a one-week tryout contract with Italian club Pistoia Basket 2000. Four days later Pistoia announced that Diawara has passed the tryout period with the team and signed a deal for the rest of the 2017–18 LBA season.

Personal life
Diawara is the youngest of Bintou and Ansoumane Diawara’s four children, having two sisters (Kankou and Fatoumata) and one brother (Sourakhata). He is fluent in French, Wolof, English, and Italian.

NBA career statistics

Regular season

|-
| align="left" | 
| align="left" | Denver
| 64 || 19 || 18.4 || .342 || .288 || .660 || 1.7 || .9 || .5 || .1 || 4.4
|-
| align="left" | 
| align="left" | Denver
| 54 || 14 || 10.0 || .410 || .318 || .710 || 1.1 || .7 || .1 || .1 || 2.8
|-
| align="left" | 
| align="left" | Miami
| 63 || 21 || 13.5 || .350 || .313 || .526 || 1.3 || .4 || .2 || .1 || 3.4
|-
| align="left" | 
| align="left" | Miami
| 6 || 2 || 7.3 || .200 || .167 || .000 || .7 || .5 || .2 || .0 || .8
|-
| align="left" | Career
| align="left" |
| 187 || 56 || 14.0 || .357 || .301 || .650 || 1.4 || .7 || .3 || .1 || 3.5

Playoffs

|-
| align="left" | 2007
| align="left" | Denver
| 1 || 0 || 1.0 || .000 || .000 || .000 || .0 || .0 || .0 || .0 || .0
|-
| align="left" | 2008
| align="left" | Denver
| 3 || 0 || 2.7 || .400 || .000 || .000 || .3 || .0 || .0 || .0 || 1.3
|-
| align="left" | 2009
| align="left" | Miami
| 5 || 0 || 4.2 || .333 || .000 || .000 || 1.0 || .0 || .2 || .0 || .4
|-
| align="left" | Career
| align="left" |
| 9 || 0 || 3.3 || .375 || .000 || .000 || .7 || .0 || .1 || .0 || .7

References

External links

Miami Heat bio
Euroleague.net profile
FIBA.com profile

1982 births
Living people
Basketball players at the 2012 Summer Olympics
BCM Gravelines players
Black French sportspeople
Big3 players
Denver Nuggets players
ESSM Le Portel players
Fortitudo Pallacanestro Bologna players
French expatriate basketball people in Italy
French expatriate basketball people in the United States
French men's basketball players
French sportspeople of Senegalese descent
JDA Dijon Basket players
Juvecaserta Basket players
Lega Basket Serie A players
Limoges CSP players
Miami Heat players
National Basketball Association players from France
New Basket Brindisi players
Olympic basketball players of France
Pallacanestro Varese players
Pepperdine Waves men's basketball players
Pistoia Basket 2000 players
Reyer Venezia players
Shooting guards
Small forwards
Southern Idaho Golden Eagles men's basketball players
Basketball players from Paris
Undrafted National Basketball Association players
French men's 3x3 basketball players